AMG-1 (part of the AM cannabinoid series) is an analgesic drug which is a cannabinoid agonist. It is a derivative of Δ8-THC with a rigidified and extended 3-position side chain. AMG-1 is a potent agonist at both CB1 and CB2 with moderate selectivity for CB1, with a Ki of 0.6 nM at CB1 vs 3.1 nM at CB2.

See also 
 O-823
 AMG-41

References 

Cannabinoids
Benzochromenes
Phenols
Alkyne derivatives